The Federation of Ukrainian Student Organizations of America or SUSTA, its acronym for Soyuz Ukrayinskykh Studentskykh Tovarystv Ameryky;() — a non-profit, apolitical, organisation run by Ukrainian and/or Ukrainian-American students/alumni of institutions of higher education. SUSTA was created in order to promote the creation and networking of Ukrainian student clubs at American universities, to educate and inform Ukrainian-American students about issues relevant to them, to encourage the development of a Ukrainian-American student movement, to foster an understanding among non-Ukrainian ethnic groups as to Ukrainian affairs and issues, to promote the formation of local Ukrainian clubs at American Universities and to support Ukrainian clubs with resources and ideas for events.  The Federation welcomes all who are interested in Ukraine, its culture, history, and society.

Mission statement
The Federation of Ukrainian Student Organizations of America  was established with the intention of fostering cooperation among Ukrainian Student Organizations and promoting their interests at large. SUSTA aims to facilitate the creation and development of Ukrainian student clubs and Ukrainian Studies programs at American universities. SUSTA disseminates information about current issues in Ukraine among all students and other community members.

History
In July 1952 the preliminary steps toward the formation of the Federation of Ukrainian Student Organizations (SUSTA) began with an initial organizing meeting held at the time of the UCCA convention in New York City. The 40 attending students set in motion the organizing process, which was primarily entrusted to the student community in Cleveland.
 
In August of that year, a joint meeting of the Cleveland and New York students clubs laid the foundation for the November forum that created an interim secretariat responsible for organizing the founding congress. That congress was held at Columbia University in April 1953 with of 68 delegates representing 22 Ukrainian student clubs attending. The total membership of Ukrainian students at that time was 654 at 50 universities and colleges.

The first Congress elected an 11-member executive board that was headed by Eleonora Kulchycka as president. The Congress declared that it was continuing the spirit of the First All-Ukrainian Student Congress held in Lviv 45 years earlier and that its purpose was to “ensure academic freedom and student rights and obligations, to represent individual student interests and nurture academic life, ... for building better organizational forums for Ukrainian students outside of Ukraine.”
 
For many decades SUSTA was in the forefront of national and human rights activism in the United States. It was an integral part of the political and social life of our community. From the time of its founding, SUSTA’s ranks have included hundreds of Ukrainian Americans in leadership capacities and thousands of members in its student clubs.

SUSTA was crucial to the efforts of Ukrainian community in establishing Chairs in Ukrainian History, Linguistics, and Literature at Harvard University and to formation in 1973 of the Harvard Ukrainian Research Institute.

The Federation was dormant in the decade before its revival in 2006 by a group of students from Columbia University, Rutgers University, University of Michigan, and Villanova University.

Executive Boards

Current Executive Board 2012-2013

SUSTA's Presidents

Past Executive Boards

References
SUSTA Official Website
 Federation of Ukrainian Student Organizations of America.  Records,1950-1966:  A Finding Aid.

Student organizations in the United States
Ukrainian American
Student organizations established in 1952
Youth organizations based in the United States
Articles containing video clips
Diaspora organizations in the United States
Ukrainian diaspora organizations